Rocroithys is a genus of sea snails, marine gastropod mollusks in the family Raphitomidae.

Species
Species within the genus Rocroithys include:
 Rocroithys niveus Sysoev & Bouchet, 2001
 Rocroithys perissus Sysoev & Bouchet, 2001
Species brought into synonymy
 Rocroithys nivea Sysoev & Bouchet, 2001: synonym of Rocroithys niveus Sysoev & Bouchet, 2001 (Misspelling. Wrong gender agreement.)

References

 Sysoev, A.; Bouchet, P. (2001). Gastéropodes turriformes (Gastropoda: Conoidea) nouveaux ou peu connus du Sud-Ouest Pacifique = New and uncommon turriform gastropods (Gastropoda: Conoidea) from the South-West Pacific. in: Bouchet, P. et al. (Ed.) Tropical deep-sea benthos. Mémoires du Muséum national d'Histoire naturelle. Série A, Zoologie. 185: 271-320.

External links
  Bouchet, P.; Kantor, Y. I.; Sysoev, A.; Puillandre, N. (2011). A new operational classification of the Conoidea (Gastropoda). Journal of Molluscan Studies. 77(3): 273-308
 
 Worldwide Mollusc Species Data Base: Raphitomidae

 
Raphitomidae
Gastropod genera